Tinombo Selatan (South Tinombo) is a district in Parigi Moutong Regency, Central Sulawesi, Indonesia.

Settlements 

 Buol
 Khatulistiwa
 Malanggo
 Malanggo Pesisir
 Maninili
 Maninili Barat
 Maninili Utara
 Oncone Raya
 Poly
 Siaga
 Sigega Bersehati
 Sigenti
 Sigenti Barat
 Sigenti Selatan
 Silutung
 Siney
 Siney Tengah
 Tada
 Tada Selatan
 Tada Timur
 Tada Utara

Districts of Central Sulawesi